Morten Sasse Suurballe (born 8 March 1955) is a Danish actor, best known for playing Detective Chief Inspector Lennart Brix in the three television series The Killing (Danish: Forbrydelsen, “The Crime”) in which he played alongside Sofie Gråbøl.

Career and personal life
Suurballe was born in Copenhagen and educated at the Danish National School of Theatre in 1978. After that, he was employed at several theatres including the Royal Danish Theatre.

He was married to actress Julie Wieth, and divorced in 2003. He is the father of Amalie Suurballe Wieth (born 1987), Johan Suurballe Wieth (born 1991) and Eigil Suurballe Rossing (born 2008).

In January 2013 Suurballe was awarded Knight of 1st Class of Order of the Dannebrog.

Filmography

Cinema 
 Kniven i hjertet (1981)
 Flamberede hjerter (1986)
 Et skud fra hjertet (1986)
 Opbrud (1988)
 Drengene fra Sankt Petri (1991)
 En dag i oktober (1991)
 Frække Frida og de frygtløse spioner (1994)
 Menneskedyret (1995)
 Carmen og Babyface (1995)
 Mimi og madammerne (1998)
 Manden som ikke ville dø (1999)
 Slip hestene løs (2000)
 Voksne mennesker (2005)
 Bag det stille ydre (2005)
 Rene hjerter (2006)
 Cecilie (2007)
 Guldhornene (movie)|Guldhornene (2007)
 Skyscraper (2011)
 Skybound (2017)

Television

 Kirsebærhaven 89 (1989)
 Gøngehøvdingen (1991-1992)
 Kald mig Liva (1992)
 Flemming og Berit (1994)
 Den hemmelige tunnel (1997)
 Rejseholdet (2000-2003)
 Ørnen (2004)
 Jul i Valhal (2005) Thrym (Jul i Valhal)
 Forbrydelsen (2007)
 Album (2008)
 Forbrydelsen II (2009)
 Anstalten [2011]
 Broen (2011)
 Forbrydelsen III (2012)
 Vikings (2014)
 X Company (2015-2017)
 Acceptable Risk (2017)

References

External links

1955 births
20th-century Danish male actors
Living people
Male actors from Copenhagen
Danish male film actors
Danish male television actors
21st-century Danish male actors
Knights First Class of the Order of the Dannebrog